The following is a list of episodes for the Polish television programme, Warsaw Shore that first aired on MTV on 10 November 2013.

Series overview

Episodes

Series 1 (2013-2014)

Series 2 (2014)

Series 3 (2015)

Series 4 (2015-2016)

Series 5 (2016)

Series 6 (2016)

Series 7 (2017)

Series 8 (2017)

Series 9 (2018)

Series 10 (2018-2019)

Series 11 (2019)

Series 12 (2019)

Series 13 (2020)

Series 14 (2020-2021)

Series 15 (2021)

Series 16 (2021)

Series 17 (2022)

Specials

References 

Warsaw Shore
2013 Polish television series debuts
2010s Polish television series
Lists of reality television series episodes